Shannon Cochran (born August 7, 1958) is an American actress. While she has numerous credits to her name, she is particularly recognizable as having played the mysterious Anna Morgan in the 2002 horror film The Ring.

Cochran played Pam Beesly's mother in The Office episode "Sexual Harassment" (later replaced by Linda Purl).

Filmography

External links
 

1958 births
American film actresses
American soap opera actresses
American television actresses
Living people
People from Greensboro, North Carolina
Theatre World Award winners